Hossein Ansarian (born 9 November 1944) is an Iranian Shia cleric.

Early life 
Hossein Ansarian was born on 9 November 1944 in Khvansar, Isfahan, Iran. His father, Muhammad Bagher, was from Haj Sheikh dynasty that were famous and important family in the Medina and Khvansar. Also, his mother was from Sayyid Mostafavi family and his nephew, Ali, was a professional footballer and actor.

Migration to Tehran 
When Hossein was three years old, they went to Tehran and lived in Khorasan district where Ali Akbar Borhan, Shia scholar, established Borhan school and Hossein participated in his classes. After high school, he decided to go to Seminary. In 1962, he went to Qom Seminary and then continued his education in Qom and Tehran Seminary.

His teachers 
He has had several teachers in different time of his education including:
 Ali-Akbar Borhan
 Sayyid Muhammad Taghi Ghazanfari Khvansari
 Sayyid Hossein Alavi Khvansari
 Hajj Sayyid Muhammad-Ali ibn al-Ridha Khvansari
 Ali Falsafi
 Hajj Sheikh Abbas Tehrani
 Hajj Agha Hossein Fatemi
 Mohammad Fazel Lankarani
 Sayyid Muhammad Muhaqheqh Damad
 Mirza Hashem Amoli
 Hussein-Ali Montazeri
 Ali Meshkini
 Mohammad Yazdi

Ansarian's translated books

Books
 Translation of the Holy Qur'an.
 Translation of Nahj al-Balāgha.
 Translation of Sahīfat al-Kāmilat al-Sajjādīyya.
 Translation and paraphrase of Mafātīh al-Janān.
 Commentary on Kūmayl's Devotions. New edition.
 Ahl-e Bayt, 'Arshīyān-e Farshneshīn ("The Prophet's (AS) Household, the Earth Inhabiting Divines").
 Mu'āsherat ("sociability, association").
 Jelve-hā-ye Rahmat-e Elāhī ("Manifestations of Divine Blessings").
 Farhang-e Mehr-varzī ("The Culture of Love").
 'Ebrat-Āmūz ("Admonitions").
 Zībā'ī-hā-ye Akhlāq ("The Beauties of Good Morals").
 Tawbe, Āghūsh-e Rahmat ("Repentance, the bosom of Mercy").
 Bar Bāl-e Andīshe ("On the Wings of Thought"), 2 vols., in print.
 Bā Kāravān-e Nūr ("Accompanying the Caravan of Light").
 Sīmā-ye Namāz ("The visage of Prayers").
 Luqmān-e Hakīm ("Luqman, the Sage").
 Furūghī az Tarbīyat-e Eslāmī ("Beams of Light from Islamic Education").
 Rasā'il-e Hajj ("Treatises on Pilgrimage to Mecca").
 Dīvān-e Ash'ār (Majmu'a-ye Ghazalīyyāt) ("Poetical Works, Collection of Ghazals).
 Pursesh-hā va Pāsukh-hā ("Questions and Answers"), 5 vols., in print.
 Nezām-e Khānevāde dar Eslām ("The Family System in Islam").
 Mūnes-e Jān ("The Beloved").
 'Erfān-e Eslāmī (Sharh-e Misbāh al-Sharī'a) ("Islamic Mysticism, Commentary on M.), 15 vols, new edition.
 Dīyār-e 'Āsheqān (Sharh-e Sahīfa al-Sajjādīyya) ("The Land of Lovers, Commentary on S.), 15 vols, in print.
 Seyr-ī dar Ma'āref-e Eslāmī, ("Survey of Islamic Teachings"), vol.1, 'Aql, Kelīd-e Ganj-e Sa'ādat ("Intellect, the Key to the Treasure of Happiness"), vol.2, 'Aql, Mahram-e Rāz-e Malakūt ("Intellect, the Confidant of the Secret of the Heaven"), vol.3, Hadīth-e 'Aql va Nafs ("Discourse on Intellect and Soul").
 Majmū'a-ye Sukhanrānī-hā-ye Mawzū'ī ("Collection of Twenty Lectures Arranged by Topics").
 Eslām va Kār va Kūshesh ("Islam, Work, and Effort").
 Eslām va 'Elm va Dānesh ("Islam, Science, and Knowledge").
 Imām Hasan Ebn-e 'Alī rā Behtar Beshenāsīm ("Let Us Improve Our Knowledge Regarding Hasan b. 'Alī (AS).
 Ma'navīyyat, Asāsī-tarīn Nīyāz-e 'Asr-e Mā ("Spirituality, The Greatest Need of Our Time").
 Besū-ye Qūr'ān va Eslām ("Towards The Qur'an and Islam").
 Marz-e Rushanā'ī ("Border of Light", collection of poetry).
 Munājāt-e 'Ārefān ("Mystics' Devotions", collection of poetry).
 Chashme-sār-e 'Eshq ("Fountain of Love", collection of poetry).
 Golzār-e Muhabbat ("Garden of Love", collection of poetry).
 'Ebrat-hā-ye Rūzgār ("Lessons of Time").
 Nasīm-e Rahmat ("Breeze of Mercy").
 Akhlāq-e Khūbān ("Moralia of the Good).
 Dar Bārgah-e Nūr ("At the Threshold of Light").
 Chehel Hadīth-e Hajj ("Forty Traditions Regarding Pilgrimage to Mecca").
 Hajj, Vādī-ye Amn ("Pilgrimage to Mecca, the Land of Security").
 Chehre-hā-ye Mahbūb va Manfūr-e Qur'ān ("Loveable and Disgusting Characters in the Qur'an").
 Adab vaĀdāb-e Zā'er ("Pilgrims' Rites").
 Rāhī be Sū-ye Akhlāq-e Eslāmī ("A Path towards Islamic Ethics").
 Velāyat va Rahbarī az Dīdgāh-e Nahj al-Balāgha ("Government and Leadership as Reflected in N.").
 Majmū'a-ye Maqālāt ("Collected Essays").
 'Ubūdīyyat ("Submission").
 Shifā' dar Qūr'ān ("Cure in Islam").
 Nafts ("Soul").
 Taqrīrāt-e Dars-e Marhūm Āyatullāh al-'Uzmā Hājj Mīrzā Hāshem-e Amulī ("Annotations Taken at the Lectures delivered by the Late A., ms.).
 Taqrīrt-e Dars-e Khrej-e Marhūm Āyatullāh al-'Uzma Hājj Shaykh Abūlfazl-e Najafī-ye Khānsārī ("Annotations Taken at the Lectures Delivered by the Late A. for Students at the Inferential Level", ms.)

See also 
 Seyyed Abdollah Fateminia
 Alireza Panahian
 Hassan Rahimpour Azghadi
 Mohsin Qara'ati

References

External links

 Hossein Ansarian's Official Website 

1944 births
Living people
Iranian Shia scholars of Islam
Iranian Shia clerics